The 1989 West Virginia Mountaineers football team represented West Virginia University in the 1989 NCAA Division I-A football season. It was the Mountaineers' 97th overall season and they competed as a Division I-A Independent. The team was led by head coach Don Nehlen, in his tenth year, and played their home games at Mountaineer Field in Morgantown, West Virginia. They finished the season with a record of eight wins, three losses and one tie (8–3–1 overall), and earned a Gator Bowl berth against No. 14 Clemson, where they were defeated 27–7.

Schedule

Season summary
Coming off of its first ever 11-win season and with junior Major Harris returning to lead a potent offense, West Virginia entered the 1989 season ranked 17th in the AP Poll and with high expectations.  The Mountaineers started the season accordingly, racing to a 4-0 record and to #9 in the AP Poll. In Week 5 against #10 Pitt, however, West Virginia fell victim to another memorable collapse in the Backyard Brawl. Trailing 31-9 in the 4th quarter, Pitt scored 22 unanswered points and kicked a game-tying field goal as time expired to force a 31-31 tie.  The Mountaineers would suffer another heartbreaking result the following week with a 12-10 home loss to Virginia Tech, as well as a 19-9 loss to #16 Penn State in State College. Despite those disappointing defeats, WVU finished the regular season at 8-2-1, a #17 ranking in the AP Poll, and a trip to the Gator Bowl to face #14 Clemson.  The Mountaineers faltered, however, losing 27-7 and finished the season at 8-3-1 with a #21 ranking in the final AP Poll.

Roster

Statistical leaders
All stats are courtesy of WVUStats.com unless otherwise cited. 
Passing: 
Major Harris - 142/245, 2,058 yards, 17 touchdowns, 11 interceptions
Rushing:
Major Harris - 155 carries, 936 yards, 6.0 average per carry, six touchdowns
Garrett Ford, Jr. - 148 carries, 733 yards, 5.0 average per carry, six touchdowns
Receiving: 
Reggie Rembert - 47 receptions, 850 yards, 11 touchdowns
Interceptions: 
Preston Waters - 7 interceptions

References

West Virginia
West Virginia Mountaineers football seasons
West Virginia Mountaineers football